Christine Major (born 1966) is a Canadian painter.

Life and work

Christine Major was born in Quebec City, Quebec, in 1966. Major earned her Bachelor of Fine Arts from the University of Ottawa and her Master of Fine Arts from the Université du Québec à Montréal. She lives and works in Montreal and teaches at the Université du Québec à Montréal. Women are generally the subject of Major's paintings, with domestic violence being a common theme.

Collections
Cuisine Rouge, 2010, Université du Québec à Montréal
 Collection Musée national des beaux-arts du Québec

Exhibitions
"Her Story Today", 2015–16, Montreal Museum of Fine Arts.
"The Disorderless of Things", 2015, Galerie de l'UQAM, University of Quebec

Further reading
Davis, Heather (editor). Desire Change: Contemporary Feminist Art in Canada. Montreal: McGill-Queen's University Press (2017).

References

1966 births
Living people
Artists from Montreal
Artists from Quebec City
University of Ottawa alumni
Université du Québec à Montréal alumni
Academic staff of the Université du Québec à Montréal
Canadian women painters
21st-century Canadian women artists